Methanosarcina thermophila is a thermophilic, acetotrophic, methane-producing archaeon.

References

Further reading

External links
Type strain of Methanosarcina thermophila at BacDive -  the Bacterial Diversity Metadatabase

Euryarchaeota
Archaea described in 2000